Richard Bokatola-Lossombo (born 11 April 1979) is a Congolese former professional footballer who played as a midfielder. He spent the majority of his career in Albania, with stints in his native Congo as well as Germany and Thailand. He was also a member of the Republic of the Congo national team and was in their 2000 African Cup of Nations squad.

In 2003 while he was in Albania, he was involved in a collision involving two pedestrians where he hit the couple waiting for a bus on the side of the road with his car travelling at 60 mph, killing them both instantly. He was charged with vehicular homicide and faced a five-year jail, but he was eventually released in December and returned to playing for Vllaznia Shkodër.

References

External links

1979 births
Living people
Republic of the Congo footballers
Association football midfielders
Republic of the Congo international footballers
2000 African Cup of Nations players
Republic of the Congo expatriate footballers
Expatriate footballers in Germany
Karlsruher SC II players
Republic of the Congo expatriate sportspeople in Germany
Expatriate footballers in Albania
KF Vllaznia Shkodër players
Republic of the Congo expatriate sportspeople in Albania
Flamurtari Vlorë players
KS Kastrioti players
KF Elbasani players
KS Lushnja players
VfR Mannheim players